Pignon Airport is an airport serving Pignon, a city in the Nord Department of Haiti. The airport has scheduled and charter airline service from Port-au-Prince.

The runway has an additional  grass overrun on the southwest end. There is a large hill just to the north of the Pignon.

History 
It was financed and built by Dr Guy Theodore.

Airlines and destinations
As of January 2021, there are no scheduled services at the airport.

See also
Transport in Haiti
List of airports in Haiti

References

External links
OpenStreetMap - Pignon

Airports in Haiti